Labinot-Fushë is a village and a former municipality in the Elbasan County, central Albania. At the 2015 local government reform it became a subdivision of the municipality Elbasan. The population at the 2011 census was 7,058. The municipal unit consists of the villages Labinot-Fushë, Godolesh, Griqan i Sipërm, Griqan i Poshtëm, Xibrake and Mengel.

References

Former municipalities in Elbasan County
Administrative units of Elbasan
Villages in Elbasan County